Eternal University is a private university in Himachal Pradesh established by an Act of the state legislature of Himachal. It is located in the  educational campus popularly known as Baru Sahib- The Valley of Divine Peace.

The university offers UGC (University Grants Commission) certified undergraduate, postgraduate and Ph.D. courses ranging from biotechnology, microbiology, agriculture, engineering and medical to management and public health only for girls.

Establishment 
The university is a full-fledged UGC Recognised University and not a Deemed University, established under the 'Himachal Pradesh Private Universities (Establishment and Regulation) Act 2006 passed by the State Legislature of Himachal Pradesh' and Himachal Pradesh Government Notification No EDN-A-GHA (8)6/2006(Loose) dated 29 April 2008).  under section 2 (f) and 12B of The UGC Act 1956.

Location 
Eternal University exists in a  campus containing a university, a number of professional colleges, an International Akal Academy, an IB world School, a multi-specialty charitable hospital, a Gurudwara, a post office, a bank, and a fuel station.

Colleges 
Eternal University has the following colleges and departments affiliated to its name:

I. Akal College Of Engineering & Technology
 Electronics & Communication Engineering
 Electrical & Electronics Engineering
 Computer Science & Engineering
II. Dr. Khem Singh Gill Akal College of Agriculture
 Department of Biotechnology
 Department of Agriculture 
 Department of Food Technology
 Department of Entomology

III.  Akal College of Economics, Commerce & Management
 Department of Economics
 Department of Commerce
 Department of Management

IV.  Akal College of Arts & Social Sciences
  Department of Divine Music and Spiritualism 
  Department of English 
  Department of Psychology 
V. Akal College of Health and Allied Sciences
 Akal College of Nursing
 Akal College of Public Health & Hospital Administration

VI.  Akal College of Education

VII.  Akal College of Basic Sciences
 Department of Biochemistry
 Department of Chemistry
 Department of Microbiology
 Department of Mathematics
 Department of Physics
 Department of Botany
 Department of Environmental Science

Clubs and societies
 The Eternal English Literary Society organises literary activities. It helps the students to improve their communication skills, and encourages them to speak in English.
 The Eternal Technocrats Club organises in technical and management events.
 The Cultural Club organizes cultural events like singing, skits and plays.
 The EU Sports Club organizes sports events like cricket, football, basketball, chess, TT, badminton, and weight lifting.
 Akal Renewable Energy Club works in collaboration with the Ministry of NRE and Research, government of India. The club promotes the use of renewable energy.

Gallery

References

External links

 Official website

Engineering colleges in Himachal Pradesh
Private universities in India
2008 establishments in Himachal Pradesh
Educational institutions established in 2008